Calvaire may refer to:

 Calvaire, French for Calvary
Calvaire (film), also known as The Ordeal, a Belgian horror film
Calvary (sculpture), a form of sculptural crucifix found in Brittany

See also
 Calvary (disambiguation)
 Le Calvaire, an 1886 novel by Octave Mirbeau